The 6th British Academy Video Game Awards (known for the purposes of sponsorship as GAME British Academy Video Games Awards) awarded by British Academy of Film and Television Arts (BAFTA), was an award ceremony honouring achievement in the field of video games in 2009. Candidate games must have been released in the United Kingdom between 1 January 2009 and 31 December 2009. The ceremony took place in the London Hilton on 19 March 2010.

Categories
Both publishers and developers were eligible to enter their games in fifteen categories, fourteen of which were awarded by a panel of judges. The categories are: Gameplay, Casual, Sports, Story and Character, Strategy, Best use of Audio, New Talent, Multiplayer, Best Technical Achievement, Original Score, Handheld, People's Choice (the only award voted for by the public), Artistic Achievement, Best Action and Adventure and Best Game.

Winners and nominees
Winners are shown first in bold.

Academy Fellowship
 Shigeru Miyamoto

Games with multiple nominations and wins

Nominations

Wins

References

External links
6th BAFTA Video Games Awards page

British Academy Games Awards ceremonies
2010 awards in the United Kingdom
2009 in video gaming
March 2010 events in the United Kingdom